Kang Mi-suk (born ) is a South Korean weightlifter, competing in the 69 kg category and representing South Korea at international competitions. 

She participated at the 2004 Summer Olympics in the 69 kg event. 
She competed at world championships, most recently at the 2003 World Weightlifting Championships.

Major results

References

External links
 

1977 births
Living people
South Korean female weightlifters
Weightlifters at the 2004 Summer Olympics
Olympic weightlifters of South Korea
Place of birth missing (living people)
Weightlifters at the 1998 Asian Games
Weightlifters at the 2002 Asian Games
Asian Games competitors for South Korea
20th-century South Korean women
21st-century South Korean women